Rehna is a town in the Nordwestmecklenburg district, in Mecklenburg-Western Pomerania, Germany. It is situated 26 km southeast of Lübeck, and 28 km northwest of Schwerin. It is part of the Hamburg Metropolitan Region.

References

Cities and towns in Mecklenburg
Nordwestmecklenburg
Populated places established in 1791